The Bristol County Ground (also known as Nevil Road and currently known as the Seat Unique Stadium for sponsorship reasons) is a senior cricket venue in Bristol, England. It is in the district of Ashley Down. The ground is home to Gloucestershire County Cricket Club.

History
Initially known as Ashley Down Ground, it was bought in 1889 by W. G. Grace and has been home to Gloucestershire ever since.  It was sold to local confectionery firm J. S. Fry & Sons and renamed Fry's Ground. The club bought the ground back in 1933 and it reverted to its original name. It was sold again in 1976, this time to Royal & Sun Alliance who renamed the ground the Phoenix County Ground for eight years before changing to The Royal & Sun Alliance County Ground until the ground was again bought by the club and took it up its current title.

The ground hosts One Day Internationals, usually one per year, with the addition of temporary seating to increase the ground's capacity. England faced India in 2018 and Pakistan in 2019 at the ground. In addition, three matches were scheduled to be played at the ground as part of the 2019 Cricket World Cup.   Of these three, 2 were abandoned without a ball being bowled due to bad weather. The only match played was Australia v Afghanistan - a match Australia won by 7 wickets.

The ground has long boundaries in comparison to most county cricket clubs.

Redevelopment 
In July 2009, Gloucestershire C.C.C. announced plans to redevelop the ground into a 20,000-capacity stadium, with an aim to retaining one day international status. The ground now includes a world class media centre and conference facilities. To help fund the project, student accommodation is included in the development. In March 2010, Bristol City Council gave the go-ahead for the new ground.

The following year, the club revised its plans due to concerns from residents on the adjacent Kennington Avenue over permanent stands at the boundary of their property. The permanent capacity will now be raised to 7,500 (8,000 including the semi-permanent Hammond Roof) with temporary seating increasing capacity to 17,500, but with other changes still implemented: new pavilion, new conference facilities and the construction of new stands (including the demolition of the Jessop stand and Tavern and the rebuilding of the Mound stand to a fixed capacity of 4,500) and  147 apartments in three blocks. These plans were approved on 31 May 2012 and development began in October 2012. The Bristol Pavilion opened in August 2013. Permanent floodlights were approved by Bristol City Council in April 2015, which were installed ready for the start of the 2016 season and which will allow the club to continue to host international matches as well as the four 2019 Cricket World Cup matches it has been allocated.

Transport connections
Montpelier railway station is under  from the ground. Former station Ashley Hill was situated outside the ground but was closed in 1964. The station is due to reopen as Ashley Down in 2024 with construction commencing in March 2023.

International centuries

One-Day International centuries 
The following table summarises the One-Day International centuries scored at Bristol County Ground.

T20 International centuries
There has only been one T20 International century at this venue.

Women's One-Day International centuries 
The following table summarises the women's One-Day International centuries scored at Bristol County Ground

See also 
List of cricket grounds in England and Wales

References 

Cricket grounds in Bristol
Music venues in Bristol
Sports venues completed in 1889
1999 Cricket World Cup stadiums
1983 Cricket World Cup stadiums
2019 Cricket World Cup stadiums